Completoria is a fungal genus in the monotypic family  Completoriaceae, of the order Entomophthorales. Completoria is itself monotypic, containing a single species, Completoria complens. The species is rare, known only from greenhouse cultures where it grows as an obligate intracellular parasite of fern gametophytes.

References

Entomophthorales
Zygomycota genera
Monotypic fungi genera